is a town located in Tochigi Prefecture, Japan. , the town had an estimated population of 31,243 in 12,061 households, and a population density of 570 persons per km².

Geography
Kaminokawa is located in the southeastern Tochigi Prefecture, approximately 90 kilometers north of Tokyo metropolis. The town area consists of flat areas and rivers, with no mountains and is a northern extension of the Kanto plain. The town is bordered by the prefectural capital of Utsunomiya to the north. The Kinugawa River flows through the town.

Surrounding municipalities
Tochigi Prefecture
 Utsunomiya
 Mooka
 Shimotsuke

Climate
Kaminokawa has a Humid continental climate (Köppen Cfa) characterized by warm summers and cold winters with heavy snowfall.  The average annual temperature in Kaminokawa is 13.8 °C. The average annual rainfall is 1378 mm with September as the wettest month. The temperatures are highest on average in August, at around 26.1 °C, and lowest in January, at around 2.4 °C.

Demographics
Per Japanese census data, the population of Kaminokawa has recently plateaued after a long period of growth.

History
The villages of Kaminokawa, Hongo and Tako were created within Haga District on April 1, 1889 with the creation of the modern municipalities system. On December 26, 1891 Tako Village was renamed Meiji Village. Kaminokawa was elevated to town status on July 1, 1893. On April 29, 1955 Kaminokawa annexed Meiji and Hongo.

Government
Kaminokawa has a mayor-council form of government with a directly elected mayor and a unicameral town council of 14 members. Kaminokawa, together with the city of Utsunomiya collectively contributes 13 members to the Tochigi Prefectural Assembly. In terms of national politics, the town is part of Tochigi 1st district of the lower house of the Diet of Japan.

Economy
The Nissan Tochigi plant is located within Kaminokawa and is a major local employer.

Education
Kaminokawa has seven public primary schools and three public middle schools operated by the town government. The town has one public high school operated by the Tochigi Prefectural Board of Education.

Transportation

Railway
Kaminokawa does not have any passenger train services.

Highway
  – Utsunomiya-Kaminokawa IC

References

External links

Official Website 

Towns in Tochigi Prefecture
Kaminokawa, Tochigi